Big Four Depot may refer to:

Lafayette, Indiana (Amtrak station), listed on the NRHP in Indiana as "Big Four Depot"
Big Four Depot (Delaware, Ohio), in operation to 1965
Big Four Depot (Galion, Ohio), listed on the NRHP in Ohio
Big Four Depot (Middletown, Ohio), listed on the NRHP in Ohio
Big Four Depot (Springfield, Ohio), in operation to 1969
Big Four Depot (Terre Haute, Indiana), more recently an Amtrak station